Cervaria is a monotypic moth genus belonging to the family Tineidae. It contains only one species, Cervaria xylinella, which is found in India. Both the genus and species were described by Francis Walker in 1866.

References

Tineidae
Monotypic moth genera
Moths of Asia
Tineidae genera
Taxa named by Francis Walker (entomologist)